Angels and Alcohol is the twentieth studio album by American country music artist Alan Jackson. It was released on July 17, 2015, via Alan's Country Records and EMI Nashville. Jackson wrote seven of the album's ten tracks. The album was produced by Keith Stegall.

Critical reception
The album has received mixed reviews from critics. Stephen Thomas Erlewine of AllMusic gave the album 4 out of 5 stars, writing that "Alan manages to not sound complacent on Angels and Alcohol because like all great country singers -- and he long ago established that he belongs in the pantheon of great country singers -- he thrives on the little telling details, whether they reside within a lyric or the freshening of a familiar three-chord turnaround.

Track listing
All songs written by Alan Jackson except where noted.

Personnel
 J.T. Corenflos - acoustic guitar, electric guitar
 Stuart Duncan - fiddle, mandolin
 Robbie Flint - slide guitar
 Larry Franklin - fiddle
 Paul Franklin - steel guitar
 Tania Hancheroff - background vocals
 Tommy Harden - drums
 Greenwood Hart - acoustic guitar, hand drum, piano
 Hoot Hester - fiddle
 Jim Hoke - accordion, harmonica
 Alan Jackson - lead vocals
 Andy Leftwich - fiddle, mandolin
 Brent Mason - acoustic guitar, electric guitar, gut string guitar
 Gary Prim - Hammond B-3 organ, piano
 John Wesley Ryles - background vocals
 Michael Severs - dobro
 Jimmie Lee Sloas - bass guitar
 Bobby Terry - banjo, acoustic guitar
 Jim Vest - steel guitar

Charts
The album debuted on the Billboard 200 at No. 5, and on the Top Country Albums chart at No. 2, selling 46,000 copies in its debut week. As of December 2015, the album has sold 135,500 copies in the US.

Album

Weekly charts

Year-end charts

References

2015 albums
Alan Jackson albums
EMI Records albums
Albums produced by Keith Stegall